WBC Dunav Ruse is a Bulgarian basketball club from Ruse playing in the Bulgarian Championship. It was won two championships and three national cups since 2008, including a double in 2012. It made its debut in FIBA competitions in the 2007-08 Eurocup.

Titles
 Bulgarian Championship (5)
  2008, 2012, 2013, 2014, 2015
 Bulgarian Cup (4)
  2010, 2011, 2012, 2013

2012-13 roster
 (1.89)  Margarita Ilieva
 (1.87)  Amanda Johnson
 (1.85)  Kristina Santiago
 (1.84)  Radina Kordova
 (1.83)  Tsvetomira Tsarenkapova
 (1.80)  Merike Anderson
 (1.80)  Kalina Peneva
 (1.78)  Marinela Agalareva
 (1.76)  Teodora Angelova
 (1.76)  Zornitsa Kostova
 (1.75)  Violina Kocheva
 (1.69)  Ines Rasimova
 (1.69)  Iva Terzieva

References

External links
Official website
Profile at eurobasket.com

Dunav Ruse
Ruse, Bulgaria
Basketball teams established in 1947
1947 establishments in Bulgaria